Barnacle Bill (released in the US as All at Sea) is a 1957 Ealing Studios comedy film, starring Alec Guinness. He plays an unsuccessful Royal Navy officer and six of his maritime ancestors. This was the final Ealing comedy (although some sources list Davy as the last), and the last film Guinness made for Ealing Studios. His first Ealing success was in Kind Hearts and Coronets (1949), in which he also played multiple roles. The film was written by the screenwriter of Passport to Pimlico.

Plot
William Horatio Ambrose wants desperately to live up to the proud family tradition; the Ambroses have always been mariners (even if not distinguished ones), hence their family motto, "Omnes per Mare" ("All at Sea"). In humorous vignettes, Guinness portrays six of his ancestors, starting with a confused caveman rowing in circles in his coracle, and ending with his own father's ignominious demise at the Battle of Jutland. Ambrose has a debilitating problem however: he suffers from violent seasickness. As a result, his contribution to the Second World War consists of testing cures for the malady.

When he retires from the Royal Navy as a captain, he purchases a dilapidated late Victorian era amusement pier (the closest thing to a command of his own) with his life savings. The workers are an apathetic bunch, led by an insolent Figg, who quits as soon as the new owner begins imposing some semblance of discipline. With the assistance of his new second-in-command, a former RN rating named Tommy, and much hard work with help by a group of bored local teenagers, Ambrose soon has the pier repaired.

Then he has to deal with the local town council, headed by the crooked Mayor Crowley and the hostile Arabella Barrington, who mistakes him for a Peeping Tom when they first meet. Every time he comes up with an ingenious way to make his business profitable, they see to it that the council outlaws it. When Crowley decides to confiscate and demolish Ambrose's pier and Barrington's bathing huts (under compulsory purchase) to further his own business interests, she resigns from the council and informs Ambrose. He counters by registering his property as a "foreign" naval vessel (christened the Arabella), under the flag of convenience of the easygoing country of "Liberama", which puts it outside the town's jurisdiction. He soon attracts many happy, paying passengers for his stationary inaugural "cruise".

Thwarted, Crowley hires Figg to take his dredger and demolish the structure late at night. Using a seasickness remedy suggested by Barrington, Ambrose is able to take to sea and foil the scheme (with his ghostly ancestors watching approvingly), but in the process, part of the pier becomes detached and floats away. He remains aboard to prevent salvagers from claiming it and drifts over to France, where he is hailed as a naval hero.

Cast
As appearing in Barnacle Bill, (main roles and screen credits identified):
Alec Guinness as Captain William Horatio Ambrose.
Irene Browne as Mrs Barrington
Maurice Denham as Mayor Crowley
Percy Herbert as Tommy
Victor Maddern as Figg
Allan Cuthbertson as Chailey
Donald Pleasence as Cashier
Harold Goodwin as Duckworth
Richard Wattis as Registrar of Shipping
Lionel Jeffries as Garrod
George Rose as Bullen
Lloyd Lamble as Superintendent Browning
Harry Locke as Reporter
Jackie Collins as June
Eric Pohlmann as Liberamanian Consul
Joan Hickson as Mrs Kent
Charles Cullum as Major Kent
Miles Malleson as Angler
Charles Lloyd-Pack as Tritton
Warren Mitchell as Artie White
Elsie Wagstaff as Mrs Gray
 Sam Kydd as Frogman, "Davy Jones"

Production
Guinness appeared in the film as a favour to the director. In later years, he recalled it as "wretched, (a film) ... I never wanted to do and only did out of friendship to Charley Frend." Although Barnacle Bill was the last Ealing comedy, it was shot at Hunstanton Pier and Elstree Studios, as Ealing Studios had closed and was sold to the BBC for television production.

Reception
Barnacle Bill opened at the Empire Cinema in London on the 11 December 1957 and was released under the title All At Sea in the United States.

Barnacle Bill (as All at Sea) was reviewed in The New York Times by Bosley Crowther. His review was sympathetic to the failings of the film and script but he did see redeeming qualities in Guinness's performance. "Mr. Clarke's whimsical notion doesn't sail quite the untroubled sea that Mr. Guinness' pier does. It runs into roughness, now and then, which requires rather diligent overacting and farcical behavior by all hands. But Mr. Guinness, who has made an art of underplaying, never goes too far overboard ..."

Box office
According to MGM records above, the film cost $659,000 to make (see budget note 1 above) and earned $405,000 in the US and Canada, plus $545,000 elsewhere, ($950,000 in total, see note 1 above) resulting in a return on investment of 44%, and a profit of $291,000.

See also
 List of British films of 1957

References

Notes

Citations

Bibliography

 Guinness, Alec. A Positively Final Appearance: A Journal, 1996–1998. London: Penguin Books, 2001. .
 Read, Piers Paul. Alec Guinness: The Authorised Biography. New York: Simon & Schuster, 2005. .

External links

 

1957 films
1957 comedy films
British comedy films
Films directed by Charles Frend
Films produced by Michael Balcon
Films with screenplays by T. E. B. Clarke
Films scored by John Addison
Ealing Studios films
Metro-Goldwyn-Mayer films
Films about cavemen
Films shot at MGM-British Studios
1950s English-language films
1950s British films